The Canadian province of Saskatchewan is geographically located in the Mountain Time Zone (GMT−07:00).  However, most of the province observes Central Standard Time (CST) (GMT−06:00) year-round. As a result, it is effectively on daylight saving time (DST) year-round, as clocks are not turned back an hour in autumn when most jurisdictions return to standard time.

The city of Lloydminster and several small communities around Lloydminster are the only exceptions to this arrangement.  Located partly in Saskatchewan and partly in Alberta, Lloydminster observes Mountain Time year-round, and it changes its clocks forward to Mountain Daylight Time each summer. The smaller communities around the city that also change time include Marsden, Neilburg, Marshall, Lashburn and Maidstone.  Because of this, the time in Saskatchewan is the same in all parts of the province during summer months only.

During the summer, clocks in the entire province match those of Calgary, Edmonton and Denver.  During the winter, clocks in most of the province outside Lloydminster match those of Winnipeg and Chicago.

History
In 1912, the first law was passed that called for the use of standard time. This law left the choice of time zone up to the municipal government.  The result was a patchwork of towns following either of the two neighbouring time zones—Mountain Standard Time (MST) or Central Standard Time—with or without daylight saving time.

During World War I and World War II, all municipalities were forced to adopt daylight saving time to save on fuel, but they were not forced to adopt the same time zone.

In 1966, the Saskatchewan provincial government sought the help of a professional astronomer living in the province.  The Milton Study (Earl R.V. Milton – A submission to the Government of Saskatchewan regarding time zones in Saskatchewan, 1966) a) concluded that Saskatchewan is in the Mountain Standard Time Zone, and b) suggested that the three prairie provinces (Alberta, Saskatchewan and Manitoba) covered too much area to share a single time zone. 

In 1966, based on the Milton Study, the Saskatchewan government passed Chapter 85, to be known as the Time Act, 1966 (Statutes of Saskatchewan, 1966). The key points of this act were:
The eastern part of Saskatchewan will permanently be one hour ahead of Mountain Standard Time (the equivalent of Central Standard Time).
In the western part of Saskatchewan (i.e., all points west of Saskatoon), municipal governments will still be able to choose what time zone to follow.

The only cities that chose not to match the rest of Saskatchewan's time zone were in the southwest, in the areas around Lloydminster and Swift Current.  Part of Lloydminster spills into Alberta, which mandates the use of daylight saving time.  In order to keep clocks synchronised throughout the city, Lloydminster chose to follow Alberta's practice of observing daylight saving time—effectively placing Lloydminster and the surrounding area on Mountain Time year-round. Swift Current and surrounding communities also observed Mountain Time until April 30, 1972, when they changed to match the rest of the province.

With respect to some province-wide matters, such as provincial elections, Central Standard Time is effectively used province-wide.   This means that during any provincial general election held when Daylight Saving Time is not in effect in Lloydminster, polls in that city will open and close an hour earlier local time compared to the rest of the province.  For other matters (for example, liquor laws), the local time is always the effective time in Lloydminster.

The town of Creighton which is across the border from the larger community of Flin Flon, Manitoba unofficially observes Central Daylight Time (CDT) with the rest of Manitoba.  Unlike Lloydminster, Creighton's use of Central Daylight Time has no legal sanction at the provincial level.  This has some interesting side effects—for example, liquor establishments in Creighton are able to stay open one hour later than establishments in Flin Flon whilst Central Daylight Time is in effect since a liquor establishment in Creighton can only be bound to observe Central Standard Time by provincial law.

In the early part of the 21st century, discussion was renewed over whether Saskatchewan should change its clocks seasonally to be synchronised with other provinces' practice.  By extension, the question was raised whether to return to the Mountain Time Zone (which would set clocks backward an hour in winter from their current observation), or to remain in the Central Time Zone (which would set clocks forward an hour in summer from their current observation, effectively enacting double Daylight Saving Time).  Premier Brad Wall had pledged to hold a referendum in the 2011 provincial election, but he later decided against it, saying it would be a waste of money since polls consistently showed a strong majority favoured the status quo.

Saskatchewan Time Zone 
Due to these discrepancies, many computer programs and major operating systems offer a distinct "Saskatchewan" option when listing time zone options that automatically disables seasonal clock changes for Daylight Saving. In the tz database, both the America/Regina and America/Swift_Current entries result in Saskatchewan time.

The current wording of the Time Act dictates "Central standard time shall be used and observed throughout the year", which is defined to be "the time that is six hours behind Greenwich time".  With respect to mean solar time, however, this translates into Saskatchewan effectively being on Daylight Saving Time year-round. In the map above, Saskatchewan is the rectangle of Central Standard Time protruding into Mountain Standard Time in Canada, visually displaying that geographically, Saskatchewan is in the Mountain Time Zone.

See also 
 Time in Canada
 Time in Arizona

References 

 
 The Saskatchewan Time System Saskatchewan Ministry of Municipal Affairs

Daylight saving time in Canada
Time in Canada